Tandian (sometimes spelled as Tandiyan) is a village in Sardulgarh tehsil of Mansa district in Punjab, India.

Geography 

Nangla, Jherian Wali (Bishanpura), Bana Wala, Behniwal, Peron and Raipur are the surrounding villages.

Culture 

Punjabi is the mother tongue as well as the official language of the village.

Religion 

The villagers predominantly are Sikhs and follows Sikhism.

Education and economy 

Education

The village has a government school which upgraded to high in 2011-12.

Economy

As common in the region, agriculture is the main source of income with nearby employers.

References 

Villages in Mansa district, India
Villages surrounding Talwandi Sabo Power Plant